The London International Stamp Exhibition 1950 was held in the Great Room, Grosvenor House, Park Lane from 6–13 May 1950, under the chairmanship of Sir John Wilson, Keeper of the Royal Philatelic Collection. A non-postal souvenir sheet was produced by Waterlow and Sons for the event using the collotype process. It depicted the Penny Black; Nova Scotia 1851 1/-; New South Wales 1850 1d Sydney View; Ceylon 1859 4d; Cape of Good Hope 1853 4d triangular. A souvenir cover showing St. George and the dragon was also available

Palmares
The principal awards went to the following exhibits:

The Grand Prix went to Herbert C. Adams (U.K.) for ‘Great Britain’.

Gold Awards of Honour went to: 
Harry Osborne for ‘Great Britain’; 
Gerald Wellburn for ‘Canada, British Columbia, etc.’; 
H. W. Hurlock  for ‘Trinidad’; 
L. E. Dawson   for ‘India and States’; 
Dr. F. E. Wood for ‘Straits Settlements and States’; 
M. Scheerlinck for ‘Belgium’; 
Eduardo Cohen for ‘Romania’; 
Dr. H. Leeman  for ‘Switzerland’; 
D. C. Gray     for ‘Netherlands’; 
R. Hoffman     for ‘Uruguay’; 
C. F. Meroni   for ‘Development of World Mails’; 
R. Abecassis   for ‘Portuguese India’.

See also

List of philatelic exhibitions (by country)

References

1950
1950 in London
May 1950 events in the United Kingdom
1950s in the City of Westminster